Mantysh is a village in the Kochkor District of Naryn Region of Kyrgyzstan. It is the center of Kara-Suu rural community. Its population was 1,393 in 2021.

References

Populated places in Naryn Region